Quiroga Ridge ('Hrebet Quiroga' \'hre-bet ki-'ro-ga\) is a submarine ridge in False Bay, Livingston Island in the South Shetland Islands of Antarctica.  It extends 2.2 km in an east-southeast to west-northwest direction between Ogosta Point on the Rozhen Peninsula and the opposite coast of Hurd Peninsula at a depth of over 50 m, with depths exceeding 100 m on both sides of the ridge. It was formed as a frontal moraine of Huntress Glacier between the 13th and 17th centuries.

The feature is named after Víctor Quiroga Martínez, captain of the Spanish ocean exploration ship BIO Hespérides that rendered logistic support to the Bulgarian Antarctic campaigns in the 1990s.

Location
Spanish mapping in 1991.

Maps
 Isla Livingston: Península Hurd. Mapa topográfico de escala 1:25000. Madrid: Servicio Geográfico del Ejército, 1991. (Map reproduced on p. 16 of the linked work)
 L.L. Ivanov. Antarctica: Livingston Island and Greenwich, Robert, Snow and Smith Islands. Scale 1:120000 topographic map.  Troyan: Manfred Wörner Foundation, 2009.  
 Antarctic Digital Database (ADD). Scale 1:250000 topographic map of Antarctica. Scientific Committee on Antarctic Research (SCAR). Since 1993, regularly upgraded and updated.
 L.L. Ivanov. Antarctica: Livingston Island and Smith Island. Scale 1:100000 topographic map. Manfred Wörner Foundation, 2017.

References
 Quiroga Ridge. SCAR Composite Antarctic Gazetteer.
 Bulgarian Antarctic Gazetteer. Antarctic Place-names Commission. (details in Bulgarian, basic data in English)

External links
 Quiroga Ridge. Copernix satellite image

Ridges of Livingston Island
Bulgaria and the Antarctic
Spain and the Antarctic